Chit Tae Yet Ko Kyo Nay Mal is a 1983 Burmese black-and-white drama film, directed by U Tin Yu starring Kawleikgyin Ne Win, Kyaw Hein, San Shar Tin and Nwet Nwet Mu. The title theme song of the film was sung by Swe Zin Htaik.

Cast
Kawleikgyin Ne Win as U Ne Win
Kyaw Hein as Kyaw Hein
San Shar Tin as Daw San Shar Tin
Nwet Nwet Mu as Nwet Nwet Mu
Aung Lwin as Aung Lwin
Kyauk Lone as U Kyauk Lone
May Thit as Daw May Thit
May Nwet as Daw May Nwet
Kyaw Win as U Kyaw Win
May Lwin as May Lwin

References

1983 films
1980s Burmese-language films
Films shot in Myanmar
Burmese black-and-white films
1983 drama films
Burmese drama films